Mads Kristian Hansen (born 28 July 2002) is a Danish professional footballer who plays as a right winger for Danish Superliga club Nordsjælland.

Club career

Midtjylland
Born in Ikast, Hansen grew up as a fan of local club FC Midtjylland, whose academy he joined at U13-level from his childhood club Ikast FC. After finishing as top goalscorer in the U19 League, he signed his first professional contract on his 18th birthday, 28 July 2020, keeping him at the club until 2025. After a season in which he stood out by scoring 19 goals in 23 games with the U19s, he was named Midtjylland U19 Player of the Year.

Hansen was promoted to the first team in the summer of 2021. He made his professional debut under new head coach Bo Henriksen during a UEFA Champions League preliminary round 1–1 draw against Scottish club Celtic away at Celtic Park. Hansen made his Danish Superliga debut a few days later in a 2–0 away win over rivals Viborg FF, coming on as a substitute for Júnior Brumado. On 24 October, he scored his first goal in injury time against SønderjyskE, which proved to be the winner in a 3–2 victory.

Nordsjælland
On 1 February 2022, Hansen joined FC Nordsjælland on a deal until June 2026. He made his competitive debut on 20 February in a 2–0 league loss to Brøndby, starting at centre-back. On 7 March, he scored his first goal for the club in a 3–2 victory against AGF.

International career
A youth international, Hansen made his debut for the Denmark U19 team on 3 September 2020, starting in a 2–1 win over Germany U19 at Edmund-Plambeck-Stadion in Norderstedt, Hamburg.

In November 2022, Hansen was called up to the Denmark under-21 team, gaining his first cap at that level on 17 November 2022 in a friendly against Sweden.

Career statistics

References

External links

2002 births
Living people
People from Ikast-Brande Municipality
Danish men's footballers
Denmark youth international footballers
Denmark under-21 international footballers
Association football wingers
Ikast FS players
FC Midtjylland players
FC Nordsjælland players
Danish Superliga players
Sportspeople from the Central Denmark Region